is a 26 episode drama/sci-fi series produced by Sunrise.

The character and mecha designs in RYVIUS were created by Hisashi Hirai, who later went on to act as the character designer for Gundam SEED.

The series is also noted for its music, a blend of western R&B/hip-hop music with J-pop vocals. This is evident in the opening song, "dis–", performed by bilingual Japanese-American singer Mika Arisaka. Most of the vocal songs were composed by M.I.D. and the thematic background instrumentals by Katsuhisa Hattori.

The anime was originally licensed by Bandai Entertainment in North America before it ended up going out of print in 2012. Following the 2012 closure of Bandai Entertainment, Sunrise announced at Otakon 2013, that Sentai Filmworks has rescued Infinite Ryvius, along with a handful of other former BEI titles.

A two volume manga adaptation was released concurrently with the series in 1999-2000, and was then published in English in 2004. A parody spin-off original net animation (ONA) series, Infinite Ryvius: Illusion, was released in 2000.

Plot

Set in the year AD 2225, mankind has spread from Earth to inhabit nearly all the planets or nearby moons in colonies and settlements. Space travel has grown and improved to the point of being commonplace. For the inhabitants of the solar system, an astronaut career isn't out of the question, and one of the schools set up to train future space voyagers is the Liebe Delta, a space station positioned somewhere in Earth's orbit. This growth is despite the mysterious phenomenon known as the Geduld, a sea of plasma that suddenly erupted from the sun along the Earth's orbital plane in AD 2137. Stretching from the sun to the edge of the solar system, this area of high temperatures and gravity pressures has never been explained.

Kouji Aiba is a sixteen-year-old boy who packed his bags and left his home on Earth for the Liebe Delta and the training to obtain his Level 2 piloting license. He journeys to the space station accompanied by his childhood friend, Aoi Housen, whom Kouji discovers to his chagrin has enrolled in the Liebe Delta's flight attendant program. En route to the spaceport Aoi gives Kouji the additional unwelcome news that his younger brother, Yuki, is also to attend the Liebe Delta and in fact the brothers will be in the same flight class together. The list of Aoi's unfortunate news to Kouji is topped by her quipping that the boys' mother Mrs. Aiba had asked Aoi to look after the brothers while at school. Kouji's unhappy moodiness does not improve.

Once aboard the space station, the students and teaching staff on the Liebe Delta were like any other school, normal and concerned with their own affairs and classes. They even had a vacation period, known as the Dive Break, when the space station ventured near the Geduld for system maintenance. Out of about 1000+ students, about 500 stayed for the break. Unknown to all, the space station, in the middle of the routine dive considered so regular that it has been entrusted to the elite Zwei cadet class, was sabotaged and the majority of the staff gassed and rendered unconscious, free falling into the depths of the Geduld Sea, where the resulting gravity pressures would crush the station and kill all aboard. The remaining adults, all instructors, sacrificed their lives in an act that they believed would save the majority of students on board. When their heroic actions proved unsuccessful and the Liebe Delta hung on the verge of collapsing, a mysterious ship named RYVIUS, hidden within the Liebe Delta activated itself and surfaced from the Geduld Sea. There were a total of 515 personnel on board the Liebe Delta at the beginning of the dive, of whom a total of 486 were successfully evacuated, meaning that a total of 29 people were killed in the sabotaged dive. 8 were instructors, 12 were the gassed staff who were later executed by the 2 saboteurs, and 9 students. The average age of the Ryvius crew is 16, so the story, despite its space-age setting, is more of a coming-of-age tale than anything else.

Stranded in space, with humanity's governments forsaking them, and within the ship anger, agitation and fear setting in, Kouji tries his best to maintain a semblance of order and peace in a time of crisis. But with fighting his own brother Yuki, dealing with his feelings for the beautiful Uranian aristocrat Fina S. Shinozaki, trying to avoid Aoi, and seeing the strange apparition of a girl in pink wandering the halls, will Kouji be able to help until the Ryvius reaches safety, or will he lose all that's dear to him in the process?

Vaia ships

The Vaia ships are said to be crucial to mankind's survival despite the effect it has on those who are exposed to it for long enough, which results in major mental breakdown, as seen with the Blue Impulse's captain after losing the battle with the Ryvius.

It was mentioned that there were six Vaia ships, which took several hundred thousand trained astronauts entering into the Geduld to capture, formulate, and secure vaias for the ships. This was made known for the purpose of protecting humanity from another Geduld phenomenon, as the gravitational warping effects of the vital guarders could easily block the advancing Geduld phenomenon.
BLACK Ryvius (Referred to as the "Brattica" by those who seek to take it.)
The main setting of the rest of the series after the destruction of the Liebe Delta, and the target of the Orbital Security Bureau, so much so that they've justified destroying Hyperion with the Blue Impulse's Vital Guarder to try and destroy them. The Ryvius is one of two Vaia ships whose Sphixs have been manifested, but is also the only one with a humanized one, Neya. The other ship is basically stripped of any humanity but the desire to kill Neya.
Vital Guarder - Einvalt, A large humanoid like mecha deployed from the lift ship housed in the front of the Ryvius, has the power to control gravitational forces in much the same way as the others, but has a much stronger localized control of gravity waves it creates (especially from its hands.)

BLUE Impulse
The first Vaia ship to be a technical casualty to the Ryvius, after using its vital guarder to destroy Hyperion. The Ryvius detached its barge cannon and with the vital guarder in hand, turned the tides of the battle in the Ryvius's favor. Impulse is no longer known after this battle, possibly decommissioned due to the loss of its vital guarder.
Vital Guarder - Verticular Drill, A powerful vital guarder capable of plowing through large masses using a strong gravitational field projected around the main drill arm, which spins with tremendous force. Was used to destroy Hyperion, which established another of its attacks, by using any sized chunks surrounding it the Verticular Drill could capture these objects in its field and fire them.

CRIMSON Dicastia
Piloted exclusively by aged women. The Dicastia boasts the greatest output of gravitational force, using smaller pods wired together. Dicastia was the first ship to score casualties on the Ryvius by firing on it while trapped in the entrapment field.
Vital Guarder - Eysfina, the pod chain system used to generate an entrapping gravity field. Used as a means to detain their target in order to safely enter firing range.

GREY Gespenst
Conrad Vicuss's Vaia ship most akin to the Ryvius, also possessing a comparable and somewhat humanoid vital guarder, but fuzed to a large fixture system at its arms and legs. It is only upon seeing Neya and recognizing her form as that of his deceased daughter that he realizes what grave wrongs he has committed. The Gespenst is capable of forming blades from gravitational forces to cut through the targets that it closes in on. It also has the ability to merge with existing 'vaia squids' to amplify its mass and gravity control and power, much to Stein's dismay, as he cannot stand to see anything that defies scientific logic.
Vital Guarder - Geist, a humanoid body fixed vital guarder with tremendous gravitational force power, estimated by Stein's numbers of being at least twice as powerful as the Ryvius. These observations were more or less proven when the Geist merged with a number of Vaia squids around it, significantly boosting its attack power. Geist continued to destroy parts of the Ryvius's vital guarder, until it separated from the large ball of mass it created around itself, and began a powerful supercharge of energy. In one final ramming attack, the Geist was annihilated, along with the Einvalt, while everyone in the lift ship is safe.

After a maddeningly fierce battle, and the loss of his vital guarder, his final words after once again being face to face with Neya, were: "Attention all hands. The Ryvius is piloted by children, I want them rescued!" before killing himself with a gun, proof that he had understood the situation on board the Ryvius during most of his pursuit of it. (He had earlier stated that the student's pleas for rescue must be a trick). This marks the end of the war between the Orbital Security Bureau and the crew of the Ryvius.

Themes and symbols
Infinite Ryvius is a complex series with many underlying themes and symbolisms.
Responsibility - The only adult characters aboard the Ryvius are written out of the story at an early stage and throughout the series the characters are regularly forced to take responsibility for difficult decisions in the absence of adult guidance.
Loss of innocence - The burden of responsibility and the many traditionally adult situations the children face bring about the premature loss of innocence.
Politics - Throughout the series the political power structure aboard the ship shifts and changes and acts as a microcosm of real-world politics.

Episodes
Some of the titles given by the series' North American distributor, Bandai Entertainment, differ from the literal translations; the Bandai-given titles appear in parentheses where applicable.
Sere 1: 
Sere 2: 
Sere 3: 
Sere 4: 
Sere 5: 
Sere 6: 
Sere 7: 
Sere 8: 
Sere 9: 
Sere 10: 
Sere 11: 
Sere 12: 
Sere 13: 
Sere 14: 
Sere 15: 
Sere 16: 
Sere 17: 
Sere 18: 
Sere 19: 
Sere 20: 
Sere 21: 
Sere 22: 
Sere 23: 
Sere 24: 
Sere 25: 
Sere 26:

Manga
A companion manga was released in Japan in 1999-2000. Created by Shinsuke Kurihashi, and released by MediaWorks Publishing, the manga details the voyage of the Ryvius from the character viewpoints of Aoi Housen, and to a lesser extent, her roommates Kozue Izumi and Reiko Ichikawa. This is in contrast to the anime, which had been seen through the eyes of the Aiba brothers, Ikumi Oze, and other mostly male characters. As such, the manga does not follow the anime "to the letter", but provides episodes and plotlines previously unseen.

The English-language rights to the Ryvius manga were acquired by ComicsOne, and the first volume of the English version, covering the anime episodes 1-13, was released in October 2004. The second and final volume, covering the remainder of the series, was expected to be released in January 2005. After ComicsOne was taken over by DrMaster, Volume 2 of the Infinite Ryvius manga was delayed. It was finally released under the new DrMaster label in May 2005.

Soundtracks
Infinite Ryvius Original Soundtrack 1
VICL-60485
Release Date: 16 December 1999
"Dis (Club Mix version)" by Mika Arisaka

"Revise Us"
"Nowhere"

"Easy Living"

  by Mika Arisaka
"Communication"
"Almost Blue"

"Faint Hope"

"Cool!"
"Dis (English version)" by Mika Arisaka
 by Mika Arisaka
"Dis" (Instrumental)
 (Instrumental)

Infinite RYVIUS Original Soundtrack 2
 VICL-60486
 Release Date: 1 March 2000
 harakunaru sasayaki (Distancing Whisper)
 nani mo shiranakutemo (Unaware of Anything)
 toge (Thorn; performed by Mika Arisaka)
 mukai aumono (Face To Face)
 genjitsuto no haza made (Until Reality Shows Its Face)
 kokoro no kakera (Fragments of the Heart)
 itoshi sa no nakade (Into Beauty)
 hayaru kokoro (Thriving Heart)
 utsutsu narumono (Taking Revenge)
 tawamurete (Flirting)
 mitsumete (Watching)
 shijirarerumono wa (Of Disbelief)
 yume o sugitemo (Even After Dreaming)
 mirai e no ippo (A Step Towards the Future)
 aragaenumama
 sasurai tsuzukete (Continued Wandering)
 tsumugareta fuan (Spun Anxiety)
 ketsui to koudou to (Decision and Action)
 todoketai kokoro (Undeliverable Heart)
 shinkirou no you ni (Like A Mirage)
 ashita ga arukara (Because There Will Be Tomorrow)
 yamikara no hohoemi (Smile From The Shadows)
 shiritakatakoto (Things I Wanted to Know)
 yume o sugimoto (Even After Dreaming; performed by Mika Arisaka)
 todoketai kokoro (Undeliverable Heart; Reggae Phil Mix)
 H (Mega Mix)

Infinite RYVIUS Original Soundtrack 3
 VICL-60487
 Release Date: 23 March 2000
 M.I.D. ANTHEM
 DIS~ (Song Bird Mix; performed by Mika Arisaka)
 BLUE WRECKAGE (performed by Noriko)
 CODE-026
 aoi tori no yukue (performed by Mika Arisaka)
 menterae
 GOING (performed by Kaori)
 JUST (Interlude)
 THE NEPHILIMS (performed by Afrika Bambaataa)
 kanashiki hyouryuu (performed by DJ MA$A)
 SEE THE LIGHT (performed by Smooth Bee and his family)
 tobira (performed by DJ MA$A)
 GENERATION WAR
 ENVIOUS
 DIS~ (Terra Mix; performed by Mika Arisaka)

Reception
In 2000, Infinite Ryvius won an award for Best TV Animation at the fifth animation Kobe.

References

External links
 Sunrise's Official Infinite Ryvius Page 
 Future Without Limits: Infinite Ryvius: The most comprehensive English-language IR website.
 

1999 anime television series debuts
2004 manga
Adventure anime and manga
Anime with original screenplays
Bandai Entertainment anime titles
ComicsOne titles
Dengeki Comics
Drama anime and manga
Fiction set on Hyperion (moon)
Mecha anime and manga
Odex
Fiction set on Saturn's moons
Television shows written by Yōsuke Kuroda
Sentai Filmworks
Shōnen manga
Sunrise (company)
TV Tokyo original programming
2000 anime ONAs